In long, slender structural elements — such as columns or truss bars — an increase of compressive force F leads to structural failure due to buckling at lower stress than the compressive strength.
 
Compressive stress has stress units (force per unit area), usually with negative values to indicate the compaction. However, in geotechnical engineering, compressive stress is represented with positive values.

Compressive stress is defined in the same way as the tensile stress but it has negative values so as to express the compression since dL has the opposite direction. ( L is the length of the object.)

Compression stress= -( F/A)

Where F= Force applied on the object.          

A= Area of cross section of the object.            

Materials science